José Benito Rosales y Sandoval (1795 Granada – 1850) was a conservative Nicaraguan politician and lawyer who served as acting Supreme Director of Nicaragua between March 8 and April 1, 1849.

Rosales was born in 1795 in Granada. He studied law at the university there and later became the dean of the university. He later became a member of the Legitimist Party.

After Agustín de Iturbide left power, the Assembly of Deputies of the United Provinces of Central America met to discuss the situation and future fate of the region. Rosales was one of the three Nicaraguan ambassadors.

He later published the newspaper El Ojo del Pueblo, Revista Conservadora del Pensamiento Centroamericano, printed in Granada. In it, he emphasised the need to make Managua the administrative center of the region.

When Supreme Director José María Guerrero was forced to resign due to health problems, he appointed Bernardo Toribio Terán Prado in his place. In March, the parliament replaced Terán with Rosales, who served until new elections.

References 

Presidents of Nicaragua
1795 births
1850 deaths